Fuck It, I Love You may refer to:

"Fuck It, I Love You" (Malcolm Middleton song), 2007
"Fuck It I Love You" (Lana Del Rey song), 2019